Rapture is the second album by American vocalist Anita Baker, released in 1986. This became Baker's breakout album and earning her two Grammy Awards. The album's first track, "Sweet Love", was a top 10 Billboard hit in addition to winning a Grammy Award. The music video for the track "Same Ole Love" was filmed at Baker's Keyboard Lounge.

Background 
Baker teamed with former Chapter 8 bandmate Michael Powell for her Elektra debut, Rapture. It was released on March 20, 1986 and the follow-up project to Baker's 1983 solo debut The Songstress, commissioned by Beverly Glen Records. Baker’s arrival onto the music industry signaled a musical rebellion, affording her voice and range to shine front-and-center.

Critical reception

In a contemporary review for Rolling Stone, Rob Hoerburger regarded Rapture as a relatively "modest" album compared to more histrionic female singers, while praising the symbiotic relationship Baker shared with her band. Occasionally, he believed, the groove-based music lacked variety, and the singer drifted into "some superfluous scatting and pseudo-jazz harmony", but Hoerburger ultimately deemed her "an acquired but enduring taste". At the end of 1986, Rapture was ranked number 2 among the "Albums of the Year" by NME. It was voted the 23rd best album of the year in the Pazz & Jop, an annual poll of American critics, published by The Village Voice. Robert Christgau, the newspaper's lead music critic, was less impressed and viewed the record as merely a soulful, sexier version of soft rock and easy listening: "it's all husky, burnished mood, the fulfillment of the quiet-storm format black radio ... a reification of the human voice as vehicle of an expression purer than expression ever ought to be".

In 1989, Rapture was ranked number 36 on Rolling Stones list of the 100 greatest albums from the 1980s. The same publication would later include the album as number 404 on their 2020 list of 500 Greatest Albums of All Time. In retrospect, AllMusic's Alex Henderson said, "Raptures tremendous success made it clear that there was still a sizeable market for adult-oriented, more traditional R&B singing." According to The Mojo Collection (2007), "when provocative new trends in black music were exploding from the street by the month, Baker kept her head and made a traditional (i.e., with its roots in the '70s) soul record with brooding, slow-burn minor tunes of romantic celebration and earthy longing." According to CBC Music journalist Amanda Parris, "Baker defined quiet storm in the '80's and her album Rapture is one of the subgenre's milestones." Pitchfork placed the album at number 149 on its list of The 200 Best Albums of the 1980s.

Commercial performance 

Rapture peaked at number 11 on the Billboard 200 in the United States and number 13 on the UK Albums Chart. Promoted with two hit singles in "Sweet Love" and "Caught Up in the Rapture", the album received significant airplay on both black radio and Top 40 formats, unlike Baker's 1983 debut The Songstress. By October 1987, Rapture had sold three million copies. It propelled Baker to stardom in soul and pop music during the late 1980s, winning two Grammy Awards and eventually sold over eight million copies worldwide.

Track listing

Personnel

Musicians

 Anita Baker – lead vocals, backing vocals (1–6), keyboards (8)
 Dean "Sir" Gant – keyboards (1, 2, 4, 7, 8), arrangements
 Vernon D. Fails – keyboards (3, 5)
 Randy Kerber – keyboards (6)
 Greg Phillinganes – synthesizer overdubs (6)
 Paul Chiten – synthesizer overdubs (6)
 Greg Moore – guitar (1, 2, 7)
 Michael J. Powell – guitar (3, 5)
 Donald Griffin – guitar (4, 8)
 Dean Parks – lead guitar (6)
 Paul Jackson Jr. – rhythm guitar (6)
 Freddie Washington – bass (1, 2, 7)
 David B. Washington – bass (3, 5, 8)
 Jimmy Haslip – bass (4)
 Neil Stubenhaus – bass (6)
 Ricky Lawson – drums (1, 2, 4, 7, 8)
 Arthur Marbury – drums (3, 5)
 John Robinson – drums (6)
 Paulinho da Costa – percussion (1, 2, 6, 7, 8)
 Lorenzo Brown – percussion (3)
 Lawrence Fratangelo – percussion (3, 5)
 Don Myrick – saxophone (2)
 Donald Albright – saxophone (8)
 Jim Gilstrap – backing vocals (1, 2, 4, 7, 8)
 Bunny Hull – backing vocals (1, 2, 4, 7, 8)
 Daryl Phinnessee – backing vocals (1, 2, 4, 6, 7, 8)
 Alex Brown – backing vocals (2, 8)
 Vesta Williams – backing vocals (2, 8)
 Natalie Jackson – backing vocals (5)
 Lynn Davis – backing vocals (6)
 Phillip Ingram – backing vocals (6)

Production
 Executive producer – Anita Baker
 Producers – Michael J. Powell (tracks 1–5, 7 & 8); Marti Sharron and Gary Skardina (track 6)
 Engineers – Barney Perkins (tracks 1–5, 7 & 8); Robert Feist and Gary Skardina (track 6)
 Assistant engineers on tracks 1–5, 7 & 8 – Keith "KC" Cohen, Fred Law, Tony Ray and Keith Seppanen
 Mixing – Barney Perkins and Michael J. Powell 
 Mastered by Bernie Grundman at Bernie Grundman Mastering (Hollywood, California)
 Art direction and photography – Carol Friedman
 Creative director – Hale Milgrim
 Design – Sue Keston

Accolades

Grammy Awards

American Music Awards

|-
|rowspan="2"|  ||| Anita Baker || Favorite Soul/R&B Female Artist || 
|-
| Rapture || Favorite Soul/R&B Album || 
|-
|rowspan="2"|  ||| Anita Baker || Favorite Soul/R&B Female Artist || 
|-
| Rapture || Favorite Soul/R&B Album || 
|-

Charts

Weekly charts

Year-end charts

Certifications and sales

See also
List of number-one R&B albums of 1986 (U.S.)

References

External links 

Rapture (Adobe Flash) at Radio3Net (streamed copy where licensed)
"Rapture" at Discogs; click the "more images" link for publishing

1986 albums
Anita Baker albums
Elektra Records albums
Albums produced by Michael J. Powell